M. Surendran was an Indian politician and former Member of the Legislative Assembly of Tamil Nadu. He was elected to the Tamil Nadu legislative assembly from Mettur constituency as a Praja Socialist Party candidate in 1967, and 1971 elections.

References 

Tamil Nadu MLAs 1967–1972
Praja Socialist Party politicians
Tamil Nadu MLAs 1971–1976
Year of birth missing
Year of death missing